CyberGladiators is a 1996 fighting game developed by K.A.A. (label of Dynamix) and published by Sierra On-Line.

The game is divided of fights between members of the Quaaflax Alliance and members of the terrorist organization Gy Djin. All characters have been transformed by a cosmic storm into CyberGladiators.

Reception
PC Zone gave the game 6.4 out of 10.

See also
Hunter Hunted, the other game by K.A.A.

References

External links

1996 video games
Fighting games
Sierra Entertainment games
Windows games
Windows-only games
Video games developed in the United States